Elpida is a Greek word which means "hope." Elpida may refer to:

People
Elpida Karamandi (1920-1942), a Macedonian partisan fighter
Elpida (singer) (born 1950), a Greek singer
Elpida Romantzi (born 1981), an archer from Greece
Elpida Tsouri (born 1961), a Member of Parliament in Greece for the Panhellenic Socialist Movement (PASOK)
Elpida Hadjidaki, marine archaeologist born in Crete, Greece
Elpida Ventures Ltd, A kenyan software, Networking and cybersecurity company, Nairobi, Kenya

Other
Elpida Memory, a DRAM manufacturer and foundry
Elpida, brand name for the HIV medication elsulfavirine
Olou Tou Kosmou I Elpida, Greek entry in Eurovision Song Contest 1992
Storm Elpida, the eastern Mediterranean winter storm that affected Greece, Turkey and other nearby countries in January 2022
Elpida Educational Consultancy, Provides Guidance and admission for professional courses at Thiruvalla, Kerala 2021